The 2008 South Carolina Democratic presidential primary took place on January 26, 2008. Senator Barack Obama of Illinois won the primary's popular vote by a 28.9% margin.

For both parties in 2008, South Carolina's was the first primary in a Southern state and the first primary in a state in which African Americans make up a sizable percentage of the electorate. For Democrats, it was also the last primary before 22 states hosted their primaries or caucuses on February 5, 2008 (Super Tuesday).

South Carolina's 45 delegates to the 2008 Democratic National Convention were awarded proportionally based on the results of the primary. The state also sent nine superdelegates.

Candidates

Remaining
New York Senator Hillary Clinton
Former North Carolina Senator John Edwards
Former Alaska Senator Mike Gravel
Illinois Senator Barack Obama

Eliminated

Delaware Senator Joe Biden Dropped out on January 4, 2008 
Connecticut Senator Chris Dodd Dropped out on January 4, 2008
New Mexico Governor Bill Richardson Dropped out on January 10, 2008 
Ohio Representative Dennis Kucinich Dropped out on January 25, 2008 
New York Comedian Stephen Colbert Denied Ballot (13-3) on November 1, 2007  and dropped out November 5, 2007

Campaign Finances
On the day of the South Carolina primary, Senator John Edwards led in fund raising from the state of South Carolina, followed by Barack Obama and Bill Richardson.

Obtained from CNN as of January 26, 2008

Polling leading up to primary

All monthly averages were retrieved from RealClearPolitics.

 Denotes Leader during Poll Average

Despite maintaining a major early lead in the polls, Senator Clinton rapidly fell after the Iowa Caucuses, as Barack Obama skyrocketed and John Edwards began to receive a gradual increase in the polling.

However, in the last three polls taken before the South Carolina Primary, Barack Obama took a commanding lead over both Edwards and Clinton. Also, Former Senator John Edwards had come into the margin of error with Senator Clinton for second place in the South Carolina Primary.

Final Campaigning

Obama Campaign

Throughout the South Carolina campaign, most pundits had predicted Barack Obama the winner, primarily because of the state's large African-American population. For this reason, Obama was shown to be significantly ahead of his two rivals, John Edwards, who carried the state in 2004, and Hillary Clinton, whose husband was popular in the African-American community. In early polls taken in the weeks leading up to the primary, Clinton had a double-digit lead over both Edwards and Obama (see poll averages above).

During a majority of the final campaigning, the attacks between the Clinton campaign and the Obama campaign highly intensified by the candidates as well as the media coverage. Barack Obama began to attack former President Bill Clinton for his comments which were taken as racist. These comments are considered by analyst and historians alike as the turning point of the South Carolina primary and ultimately the cause of Clinton's loss of support from the black community.

Despite the increasing tensions between the Clinton and Obama camps, Obama continued to widely lead in the polls (despite a surge by Edwards). Into the final days of the campaign in South Carolina, it became apparent that Obama would win by a rather wide margin. The final tally had Obama winning by 28.9% over his closest rival, Hillary Clinton.

Clinton Campaign

In the early months of the campaign, Clinton enjoyed a steep lead over Senator Obama, and a 30-point lead over former Senator John Edwards. However, after Obama's win in Iowa, Clinton's campaign in South Carolina began to fall apart by the Obama political machine rolling into South Carolina with force.

For Clinton, despite winning the popular vote in Nevada, the fact that she had lost Nevada's National Delegates, receiving 12 compared to Obama's 13 still lingered in the media. This, combined with the fact of Bill Clinton's continuing negative publicity from "injecting race into the campaign" as several people called Bill Clinton's actions in his wife's campaign.

Between battling media scrutiny on Bill Clinton, constant attacks between the Obama and Clinton campaigns, and a surging John Edwards which threatened a Clinton second-place finish, poll number began to plunge, with a poll taken by Reuters-Cspan-Zogby showing Clinton in the margin of error for second place with Edwards, with Edwards at 21% and Clinton at 25%. This was also combined with the fact of Edwards's constant barrage of attacks claiming Clinton (and Obama's) big city politics were "too good for the people of South Carolina".

However, despite the attacks from opponents that Bill Clinton's attacks largely alienated African-Americans, Clinton was able to keep a 35% support amongst that key constituency, while losing the white vote to Edwards, In the end, Clinton's African-American support was able to place her in a clear second-place finish, finishing 9 points ahead of John Edwards despite losing to Obama by 29 points.

Edwards Campaign

After the terrible results for the Edwards Campaign during the Nevada caucuses, in which Edwards finished in third with 4% of the state delegation and received no national delegates, South Carolina began to look as a state where he needed a strong finish, after finishing in third in the last three primaries which took place, and trailing in the number of total national delegates.

South Carolina was the state in which Edwards was born and raised. In 2004, Edwards won the South Carolina Primary, with 45% of the vote to John Kerry's 30% and Al Sharpton's 10%. While entering South Carolina, it became apparent that he needed a first-place finish, which seemed impossible, or a second-place finish, which seemed more within grasp.

Before the CNN South Carolina Debate in Myrtle Beach on Monday, January 21, 2008, John Edwards was placing a distant third in a poll taken before the debates on January 19, in which he placed third with 15% compared to Hillary Clinton's second place with 27%. However, after the South Carolina debates, the tone of the campaign severely shifted.
 
During the South Carolina Democratic Debate in Myrtle Beach, Edwards sought to distinguish himself from Senators Obama and Clinton, and criticized them for their attacks and "big city" politics. As soon as he began to question how the attacks helped, he was widely cheered by the audience for in what many people thought was what distinguished Edwards from negative campaigning. Saying "This kind of squabbling, how many children are going to get healthcare? How many people are going to get an education from this? How many kids are going to be able to go to college because of this? We have got to understand and I respect both of my fellow candidates, but we have got to understand that this is not about us personally, it is about what we are trying to do for this country and what we believe in", Edwards began to get applause from several members of the audience.

After the debate, John Edwards began to see a major influx of money and in turn, poll numbers began to rise rapidly in Edwards's favor. Along with the debate performance, Bill Clinton's remarks began to alienate black supporters from Clinton, and white supporters from Obama. As a result, Edwards won amongst white voters ages 30 to 50, while receiving the same amount of support from white 60+ year olds as Hillary Clinton according to CNN Exit Polls 

However, Edwards was not able to get much support from non-whites, and according to Exit Polls, received only 2% of the non-white support, while receiving 40% of the white support.

Results 

Barack Obama won the primary, taking 44 of the 46 counties; Edwards won in his native Oconee County, while Clinton won in Horry County, which contains Myrtle Beach. Those in italics are candidates who have withdrawn from the race but still remained on the ballot.

Results by county

Delegates: The South Carolina Democratic Party - State Election Results

See also
 South Carolina primary
 South Carolina Republican primary, 2008

References

External links
US Election Atlas
South Carolina Democratic Party
2008 SC Primary

2008 South Carolina elections
2008 United States Democratic presidential primaries by state
2008